Alexander Lecaros Aragón (born 13 October 1999) is a Peruvian footballer who plays as a winger for Carlos A. Mannucci.

Career statistics

Club

Notes

References

External links

1999 births
Living people
Peruvian footballers
Association football wingers
Peruvian Primera División players
Campeonato Brasileiro Série A players
Real Garcilaso footballers
Carlos A. Mannucci players
Botafogo de Futebol e Regatas players
Avaí FC players
Peruvian expatriate footballers
Peruvian expatriate sportspeople in Brazil
Expatriate footballers in Brazil